Euphorbia horombensis is a species of plant in the family Euphorbiaceae. It is endemic to Madagascar.  Its natural habitat is rocky areas. It is threatened by habitat loss.

References

Endemic flora of Madagascar
horombensis
Endangered plants
Taxonomy articles created by Polbot